Logic models are hypothesized descriptions of the chain of causes and effects leading to an outcome of interest (e.g. prevalence of cardiovascular diseases, annual traffic collision, etc). While they can be in a narrative form, logic model usually take form in a graphical depiction of the "if-then" (causal) relationships between the various elements leading to the outcome. However, the logic model is more than the graphical depiction: it is also the theories, scientific evidences, assumptions and beliefs that support it and the various processes behind it.

Logic models are used by planners, funders, managers and evaluators of programs and interventions to plan, communicate, implement and evaluate them. They are being employed as well by health scientific community to organize and conduct literature reviews such as systematic reviews. Domains of application are various, e.g. waste management, poultry inspection, business education, heart disease and stroke prevention. Since they are used in various contexts and for different purposes, their typical components and levels of complexity varies in literature (compare for example the W.K. Kellogg Foundation presentation of logic model, mainly aimed for evaluation, and the numerous types of logic models in the intervention mapping framework). In addition, depending on the purpose of the logic model, elements depicted and the relationships between them is more or less detailed.

History of logic models 
Citing Funnell and Rogers's account (2011), Joy A. Frechtling's (2015) encyclopedia article traces logic model underpinnings to the 1950s. Patricia J. Rogers's (2005) encyclopedia article instead traces it back to Edward A. Suchman's (1967) book about evaluative research.  Both encyclopedia articles and LeCroy (2018) mention increasing interest, usage and publications about the subject.

Uses of the logic model

Program planning
One of the most important uses of the logic model is for program planning. It is suggested to use the logic model to focus on the intended outcomes of a particular program. The guiding questions change from "what is being done?" to "what needs to be done"? McCawley suggests that by using this new reasoning, a logic model for a program can be built by asking the following questions in sequence:

 What is the current situation that we intend to impact?
 What will it look like when we achieve the desired situation or outcome?
 What behaviors need to change for that outcome to be achieved?
 What knowledge or skills do people need before the behavior will change?
 What activities need to be performed to cause the necessary learning?
 What resources will be required to achieve the desired outcome?

By placing the focus on ultimate outcomes or results, planners can think backward through the logic model to identify how best to achieve the desired results. Here it helps managers to 'plan with the end in mind', rather than just consider inputs (e.g. budgets, employees) or the tasks that must be done.

Evaluation
The logic model is often used in government or not-for-profit organizations, where the mission and vision are not aimed at achieving a financial benefit. Traditionally, government programs were described only in terms of their budgets.  It is easy to measure the amount of money spent on a program, but this is a poor indicator of outcomes. Likewise it is relatively easy to measure the amount of work done (e.g. number of workers or number of years spent), but the workers may have just been 'spinning their wheels' without getting very far in terms of ultimate results or outcomes.

However, nature of outcomes varies. To measure the progress toward outcomes, some initiatives may require an ad hoc measurement instrument. In addition, in programs such as in education or social programs, outcomes are usually in the long-term and may requires numerous intermediate changes (attitudes, social norm, industry practices, etc.) to advance progressively toward the outcomes.

By making clear the intended outcomes and the causal pathways leading to them, a program logic model provides the basis upon which planners and evaluators can develop a measurement plan and adequate instruments. Instead of only looking at the outcome progress, planners can open the "black box" and examine if the intermediate outcomes progress as planned. In addition, the pathways of numerous outcomes are still largely misunderstood due their complexity, their unpredictability and lack of scientific / practical evidences. Therefore, with proper research design, one may not only assess the progress of intermediate outcomes, but evaluate as well if the program theory of change is accurate, i.e. is successful change of an intermediate outcomes provokes the hypothesized subsequent effects in the causal pathway. Finally, outcomes may easily be achieved through processes independent of the program and an evaluation of those outcomes would suggest program success when in fact external outputs were responsible for the outcomes.

Various types of logic models

The Inputs → Activities → Outputs → Outcomes template 
Many authors and guides use the following template when speaking about logic model:

Many refinements and variations have been added to the basic template. For example, many versions of logic models set out a series of outcomes/impacts, explaining in more detail the logic of how an intervention contributes to intended or observed results. Others often distinguish short-term, medium-term and long-term results, and between direct and indirect results.

Intervention mapping logic models 

The intervention mapping approach of Bartholomew et al. makes an extensive use of the logic model through the whole life-cycle of a health promotion program. Since this method can start from as far as a vague desired outcome (author's example is a city whose actors decide to address "health issues" of the city), planners go through various steps in order to develop effective interventions and properly evaluate them. There are distinguishable but closely interwoven logic models with different purposes that can be developed through the process:

 Logic model of the problem, which is a graphical depiction of at-risk population and its social environment behaviors (factors) leading to the health problem and their respective causal pathways (attitudes, beliefs, skills, etc.). This may include as well at-risk population physical environment related causes such as pollutants or lack of physical activity infrastructure and their respective causes, i.e. environmental agents behaviors leading to the physical environment causes and their respective causal pathways;
 Once the most relevant behaviors and causal pathways are identified, planners develop a logic model of change. This is a model of behavioral changes (performance objectives) that should happen and their corresponding necessary changes higher up in the cause-effects chain.
 Finally, a logic model of the intervention is developed. This model describes the various activities that will happen and the cascades of effects they are expected to cause toward the desired outcome.

Evaluators thereafter use the logic model of the intervention to design a proper evaluation plan to assess implementation, impact and efficiency.

Progressive Outcomes Scale Logic Models (POSLM) 

The Progressive Outcomes Scale Logic Model (POSLM) approach was developed by Quisha Brown in response to the racial wealth gap [exacerbated by the COVID-19 pandemic] to aid organizations in the immediate need to add a racial equity focus when developing program logic models. More testing and research is needed in order to verify the validity of this model. 

The POSLM approach makes use of the logic model with a strong focus on tracking progressive improvement towards racial disparity outcomes. To measure the progress towards outcomes, this type of logic model states short, intermediate and long-term outcomes as "stage 1", "stage 2" and "stage 3. Each stage is uniquely defined and used to depict the percentage of KPIs achieved at each stage or the percentage of people who reach each stage as they progress on pre-identified Key Performance Indicators (KPI). These KPIs are specific to the racial disparity issues which the population served identifies with (i.e. low reading, financial literacy, unemployment, etc). In an effort to prevent the logic model itself from being cluttered with an overwhelming number of KPIs, the KPIs are arranged by category and only the category is displayed on the logic model. The extensive list of KPIs are an appendix to the logic model. Organizations identify the KPIs and corresponding outcomes by first conducting a needs assessment and/or community focus groups. This helps to ensure that the logic model remains focused on improving the real-time needs of people to remove racial barriers. The POSLM can help to make more clear the intended outcomes and the casual pathways leading to them; both of which help to connect and compose a logical companion "if, then" theory of change statement. Again, more research is needed and currently being conducted as more nonprofits, philanthropic and governments use this model.

Advantages
By describing work in this way, managers have an easier way to define the work and measure it.  Performance measures can be drawn from any of the steps.  One of the key insights of the logic model is the importance of measuring final outcomes or results, because it is quite possible to waste time and money (inputs), "spin the wheels" on work activities, or produce outputs without achieving desired outcomes.  It is these outcomes (impacts, long-term results) that are the only justification for doing the work in the first place.  For commercial organizations, outcomes relate to profit.  For not-for-profit or governmental organizations, outcomes relate to successful achievement of mission or program goals.

Disadvantages
There are some potential disadvantages of logic models due to tendencies toward oversimplification. These include:
Program logic is no guarantee of actual logic in how the program may work. The world is complex, and some situations cannot be ascertained before they are implemented, so some programs may even progress against the "logic" of the model.
It is a partial representation of a complex system.
It is a representation of reality, not reality itself. Programs are not linear
Normally, it does not include effects besides those initially expected.
They do not necessarily establish causality. Many factors exert influence upon the effects.

See also
 Theory of change
 Backcasting
 Critical theory
 Scenario planning
 Thought experiment

References

Further reading 

 
 
 
 
 
 
 
 
 
 

Evaluation methods
Conceptual models